Edward Leslie "Ted" Hamilton (OAM) (born 1937), is an Australian singer, composer, playwright, entrepreneur, and actor. He is known for playing the Pirate King in The Pirate Movie and police constable Kevin Dwyer in Division 4 (1969–73). More recently, he played Merlin in the TV series Guinevere Jones. He also played in Homicide, The Love Boat, M*A*S*H, The Six Million Dollar Man, Hawaii Five-O, Mission: Impossible, and Rafferty's Rules.

Biography

In 1955, Hamilton began performing in nightclubs, and live on national radio. He guest starred on The Ford Show, Calling The Stars and The Gladys Moncrieff Show. He also had hit records with "Primrose Lane" and "The Things We Did Last Summer".  

His most successful single was a 1959 duet with the late Ray Melton on HMV with a cover of US duo Travis and Bob's '59 hit "Tell Him No".  Their cover reached #6 in Melbourne, and was a top 20 hit in Sydney, Brisbane and Perth. 

Hamilton was also the featured singer with The Bob Gibson Band and the Australian All-Stars jazz quintet.

Hamilton guest starred on Australia's first variety show broadcast in 1956 on New Year's Eve on ABC TV. Also in the 1950s, Hamilton featured in variety shows on all networks, including The Hit Parade (ABC), Make Mine Music (ABC), Bandstand (Channel 9), Sydney Tonight (Channel 7), and in the 1960s the seminal variety show Revue 61/62.

Song career

Hamilton made his debut as singer-songwriter and starred with many of the top musicians and groups of the day, including Don Burrows, Terry Wilkinson and Errol Buddle – Bob Gibson's swing band – The Australian Jazz Quintet and The Australian All Stars. He was voted best singer in jazz and pop by Bandstand and music magazine Downbeat.

In 1961–62, Hamilton was a regular on the television show Revue 61/62, produced by MCA (America) for the 7 Network. In late 1965, Hamilton compered In Melbourne Tonight on Monday nights on Channel 9.

He provided the voice/image for some of Australia's most popular and successful commercials, such as:

 Craven A, Mac. Robertson Land
 IC-POTA 
 Beautiful Rheingold 
 Marshall Batteries – Philip Morris (Oh! What a Beauty) 
 Coca-Cola
 Kodak 
 Louie the fly

He also starred in several variety specials, among them Ted Hamilton and Johnny Farnham – together again for the very first time (June 1973).

Sports

Hamilton was in the World Champion Squash team. He competed for NSW and Australia and Victoria from 1962 to 1970.

Politics and film career 

Hamilton starred in Division 4 as Senior Constable Kevin Dwyer, winning best actor and best drama Logie awards. He also performed in a number of national theater productions. Hamilton was founder and chair of the TV-Make it Australian Committee, a lobby group that pushed to have Australian culture represented by local productions on Australian TV stations. The group lobbied the government for delineation of categories for Australian TV in drama, variety, comedy, current affairs, and sport. The group was the most successful lobby group in the history of Australian show business. Hector Crawford, and Prime Minister John Gorton acknowledged Hamilton and the committee as "The man, and the committee that saved Australian drama from extinction".

From 1970 to 1972, Hamilton was the co-convener of the Australia Party. He headed the run for Parliament and his party was successful in having several senators elected. Upon Hamilton's departure for America, the party provided the nucleus of the Australian Democrats, led for many years by Don Chipp.  Hamilton was also involved in the "It's Time" campaign, along with Mick Young and Clive Holding.

Hamilton also devised and appeared in a TV commercial for the Philip Morris cigarette brand "Kingford". The commercial won the Logie award for Best TV Commercial in 1974, but resulted in Hamilton's dismissal from "Division 4", as his appearance violated a contract clause specifying that series regulars wouldn't appear in television commercials. He went on to host his own national variety shows on the ABC: Ted Hamilton's New Wave and Ted Hamilton's Musical World. In 1975, because of his chairmanship of the TV-Make It Australian Committee, the doors to Australian commercial television slammed. Hamilton was banned from Channel 9 by Clyde Packer, and informed that he would not be employed by the networks again (he has not been employed by 7 or 9 since). Facing this restriction in a television dominated profession; Hamilton moved his family to the United States and established an acting and corporate career.

In 1980, when Rupert Murdoch attempted to establish a television presence in Australia, he acquired the Ten Channel in Melbourne. He invited Hamilton to return to Australia, to host The Ted Hamilton Show. However, the Broadcasting Control Board opposed his ownership and Murdoch quickly surrendered the idea, and sold his interest. In 1981 Hamilton starred in The Pirate Movie with Christopher Atkins and Kristy McNichol.  Hamilton and his partner David Joseph produced The Pirate Movie, the first Australian movie to receive a general release in the United States (2,500 screens 20th Century Fox). Hamilton provided development finance for The Wild Duck (Liv Ullmann and Jeremy Irons) for J. C. Williamson productions, and The Flight of the Navigator for Disney Studios.

Involvement in United States and return to Australia
In 1981 Hamilton returned to the United States. He was appointed chairman of two US companies involved in the placement of private capital for films and corporations. He also served as a senior consultant to several national companies in the US. In 2001 Hamilton returned to Australia, performing in music and acting. In 2002 he performed in the international television series Guinevere Jones, playing the role of Merlin. In 2011 Hamilton was appointed Australia Day Ambassador.

Social involvement and honors

In the 2013 Australia Day Honours List Hamilton was awarded an OAM for service to the performing arts and to the community.

Discography

Studio albums

Singles

References

External links

1937 births
Living people
Australian male voice actors
Australian male film actors
Australian male television actors